Howey-In-The-Hills is a town in Lake County, Florida, United States. The population was 1,098 at the 2010 census and an estimated 1,175 in 2018. It is part of the Orlando–Kissimmee–Sanford Metropolitan Statistical Area.

History

Howey-in-the-Hills was founded by William John Howey, a citrus grower and real-estate developer. On May 8, 1925, Howey-in-the-Hills was incorporated as the Town of Howey. In 1927 the name was officially changed to Howey-in-the-Hills, to reflect the location of the town in an area of rolling hills.

The first citrus juice plant in Florida was built in Howey-in-the-Hills by William John Howey in 1921.

Geography

Howey-in-the-Hills is located in central Lake County at  (28.716221, –81.774540). It sits on the west shore of Little Lake Harris, an arm of Lake Harris. The town is bordered to the northwest by the unincorporated community of Yalaha.

Florida State Road 19 passes through the town as Palm Avenue. It leads north across Little Lake Harris and leads  to Tavares, the Lake county seat. To the south SR 19 leads  to Groveland.

Demographics

As of the census of 2000, there were 956 people, 385 households, and 291 families residing in the town. The racial makeup of the town was 96.97% White, 0.52% African American, 0.21% Native American, 0.73% Asian, 0.21% from other races, and 1.36% from two or more races. Hispanic or Latino of any race were 2.20% of the population.

There were 385 households, out of which 27.8% had children under the age of 18 living with them, 64.9% were married couples living together, 7.8% had a female householder with no husband present, and 24.4% were non-families. 18.4% of all households were made up of individuals, and 8.3% had someone living alone who was 65 years of age or older.  The average household size was 2.48 and the average family size was 2.80.

In the town, the population was spread out, with 20.7% under the age of 18, 4.5% from 18 to 24, 24.2% from 25 to 44, 29.0% from 45 to 64, and 21.7% who were 65 years of age or older.  The median age was 45 years. For every 100 females, there were 98.8 males.  For every 100 females age 18 and over, there were 99.5 males.

The median income for a household in the town was $49,327, and the median income for a family was $51,458. Males had a median income of $39,773 versus $27,727 for females. The per capita income for the town was $23,273.  About 3.4% of families and 5.7% of the population were below the poverty line, including 9.5% of those under age 18 and 2.2% of those age 65 or over.

References

External links
 Howey-In-The-Hills official website

Towns in Lake County, Florida
Greater Orlando
Towns in Florida
William John Howey